PCOS Challenge is an American informational video series about polycystic ovary syndrome (PCOS), produced by William R. Patterson and microbiologist Sasha Ottey, president of PCOS Challenge, Inc. Ottey started PCOS Challenge after her PCOS diagnosis in 2008. The aim of the videos is to bridge a perceived gap in information for sufferers of the condition; they provide information on common PCOS symptoms including infertility, diabetes, obesity, heart disease, anxiety, depression, and hirsutism, and have been shown on public access television stations in the United States.

PCOS Challenge, Inc. 
PCOS Challenge, Inc. is a nonprofit organization providing support for women with polycystic ovarian syndrome through television and radio programming, educational workshops, and online and offline support networks.

PCOS Challenge Radio Show 
In order to raise awareness about PCOS and related conditions, Sasha Ottey, founder and Executive Director of PCOS Challenge, Inc., hosts the PCOS Challenge radio show, which features interviews with experts, authors and women who live with PCOS.

Season one
The show follows ten women with PCOS who are coached by dietician Rebecca Mohning, fitness trainer Josef Brandenburg, and clinical psychologist Ruth Wittersgreen. The women are also guided by alternative and traditional medical experts including reproductive endocrinologists, dermatologists, acupuncturists, and naturopathic physicians.

For nutrition, much of the focus was on eating a low-carbohydrate diet to help improve insulin sensitivity that has been linked to many of the problems associated with PCOS. The women take fish oil and vitamin D to help improve their insulin sensitivity.

In addition to the low-carb diet, the participants followed an anaerobic exercise program, focused on resistance training and high-intensity interval training.

Episodes
In each episode, the women share their experiences living with polycystic ovary syndrome and learn ways to overcome their challenges with the condition.

References

External links
 Official PCOS Challenge Television Show Website
 PCOS Challenge Nonprofit Organizational Website
 PCOS Challenge Support Network

2010 American television series debuts
2010s American reality television series
2010s American documentary television series
2020s American reality television series
2020s American documentary television series